Pimps of Joytime is an American soul music band from Brooklyn and New Orleans.

In May 2017 they performed at the 9th annual Rooster Walk Music and Arts Festival in Martinsville, Virginia.

Discography
 2007: High Steppin
 2008: Funk Fixes and Remixes
 2011: Janxta Funk!
 2014: "Booty Text" (single)
 2015: Jukestone Paradise
 2017: Third Wall Chronicles
 2022: Reachin' Up

References

External links
 Official website
 Q & A with Brian Jay at Forecastle Tadoo.com, July 12, 2013
Making People Sweat: An Interview with Pimps of Joytime

American funk musical groups
Musical groups established in 2005
American soul musical groups